Matthew Luo Duxi (1919 – December 4, 2009) was the Chinese Patriotic Catholic Association bishop of Leshan, China.

Ordained a priest in 1983, he was chosen by the Chinese Patriotic Catholic Association to be bishop and was ordained in 1993. The Vatican later gave its approval.

Notes

1919 births
2009 deaths
Sichuanese Roman Catholics
20th-century Roman Catholic bishops in China
21st-century Roman Catholic bishops in China